Ľutov is a village and municipality in Bánovce nad Bebravou District in the Trenčín Region of north-western Slovakia.

History
In historical records the village was first mentioned in 1389.

Geography
The municipality lies at an altitude of 248 metres and covers an area of 8.577 km². It has a population of about 135 people.

External links
  Official page
http://www.statistics.sk/mosmis/eng/run.html

Villages and municipalities in Bánovce nad Bebravou District